Mi krop, also spelled mee krob, is a Thai dish consisting of deep-fried rice vermicelli noodles with a sweet and sour sauce. Mi krop means "crisp noodles". The citrusy, sour note in the sauce often comes from the peel of som sa, a Thai citrus fruit similar to citron.

The dish consists of crispy fried thin rice noodles mixed with fried tofu, fried shrimp, pork, or a combination, and sauced with a mixture of lemon or lime juice, fish sauce, tomato paste, kaffir lime leaves, chilis, and sugar. The dish can be garnished with scallions, bean sprouts, cilantro, chilis, and fried egg strips.         

The dish has a legend, when King Rama V visited the people by boat in the Talad Phlu area and smell the noodles that a Chinese immigrant named "Chin Li" (จีนหลี) stir-frying at that time. He stopped the boat, ate it, and very much liked it.  This led to the dish receiving another name: Mi krop ror ha.

In Bangkok, there are two restaurants notable for their Mi krop: Talat Phlu in the Thon Buri side, and Phra Nakhon near the Giant Swing and Bangkok City Hall. Both use old recipes from the reign of King Rama V.

The dish was mentioned by Carrie Bradshaw in an episode of Sex and the City. It is listed as one of several items Sheldon Cooper from The Big Bang Theory gets on The Gang's weekly Thai food night.

References

Thai noodle dishes
Fried noodles